Sinhala  idioms (rūḍi) and colloquial expressions that are widely used to communicate figuratively, as with any other developed language. This page also contains a list of old and popular Sinhala proverbs, which are known as prastā piruḷu in Sinhala. Most of these phrases and translations can be found in the book Atīta Vākya Dīpaniya, and in the Dictionary of the Proverbs of the Sinhalese.

List of Sinhala idioms

Sinhala proverbs

References

Further reading
 http://www.island.lk/index.php?page_cat=article-details&page=article-details&code_title=56105

Sinhala language
Idioms